Hayley Angel Holt is an actress born in London, England.

Early life
Holt spent the formative years of her childhood growing up in the South Bank area. She was originally brought up in Southwark, and educated at the Grey Coat Hospital in Sloane Square. She studied drama at the Anna Scher Theatre, as well as classical ballet at the London Studio Centre.

Career
In 2000 as a teenager, Holt's first break came playing the daughter of Anita Dobson and Leslie Grantham in the screen revival for two-part drama The Stretch for Sky1. She also guest starred in an episode of the BBC drama The Robinsons with Hugh Bonneville and Martin Freeman.

She played one of the lead roles as drummer Neve, on Channel 4 TV series Totally Frank, about a girl band, which aired between 2005-2006. Holt played the drums for this role and toured nationwide UK venues as the band Frank, who also released a single and album.

Holt played Kitty Mason in Sky1's drama, Martina Cole's The Take opposite Tom Hardy and Brian Cox. She appeared in the 2008 rockabilly horror film Flick (released in North America late Nov 2010) as Young Sally Andrews alongside Faye Dunaway, Hugh O'Conor and Liz Smith.

Holt appeared as the lead actress Sophie in the debut of a new comedy musical Departure Lounge at the Edinburgh Fringe Festival at the George Square Theatre, which won the Scotsman Edinburgh Fringe award for Best Music. In 2014, Holt played the role of Welsh party girl Angharad in comedy Three Little Birds for New Diorama Theatre.

In 2015, Holt returned to education after being offered a place at The Royal Central School of Speech and Drama to study for an MA in Applied Theatre. Holt graduated in 2016 having written her paper exploring whether comedy can be used as an effective communication tool to challenge mainstream society and their existing perspectives of the socially excluded.

As a writer Holt was a top finalist for the prestigious BBC Caroline Aherne Bursary in 2019 as a Writer and   Performer.https://www.bbc.co.uk/commissioning/comedy/caroline-aherne-bursary/. Holt has been highlighted as an Artist to "Watch Out For" in the Evening Standard, made the front cover the Times Culture Magazine section and has been featured in Company magazine.

As a Director, Holt was an Associate Director on Educated at Battersea Arts Centre. An Associate Director on BOUDICCA at Jacksons Lane, and various projects for Almeida Theatre, Arcola Theatre, Tricycle Theatre as well as Movement Director for Access All Areas Theatre Company.

Filmography
(includes Made-For-Television movies and TV Series)
 La La Land (TV pilot) (2012) as Coco
 Dust (2011) as Annabel 
 Baby One More Time (unaired pilot) (2010) as Suzanne Donnelly
 The Take (episode 1) (2009) (TV series) as Kitty Mason
 Flick (2008) as Young Sally
 Fur TV (episode Rent Boys/Hot Pussy) (2008) (TV series) as Kiki LaVash
 The Bill (episode Love, Lies and Limos) (2007) (TV series) as Siobhan Docherty
 Totally Frank (2005–2006) (TV series) as Neve
 The Robinsons (episode #1.5) (2005) (TV Series) as Crowd
 The Bill (episode 291) (2005) (TV series) as Morag Jones
 Holby City (episode I'm Not in Love) (2001) (TV series) as Sharon
 Invisible Intelligence (2001) as Jess Howell
 The Bill (episodes "Gentle Touch: Part 1" and "Gentle Touch: Part 2")  (2000) (TV series) as Susan Grey
 EastEnders (TV series) as Sophie (2000)
 The Stretch (2000) (TV) as Trisha Greene
 Casualty (episode "Private Lives") (1997) (TV series) as Lucy

Stage
 Three Little Birds (2014) as Angharad (New Diorama Theatre)
 Departure Lounge (2008) as Sophie (4–25 August 2008 at George Square, Edinburgh Festival Fringe 08)
 The Rising of the Titanic (1999) as Annabelle

Directing
 Educated (2017) as Associate Director (Homegrown at Battersea Arts Centre)

Own Appearances
 T4 (episode dated 3 August 2006) (2006) (TV series) as Herself
 Being Frank (2006) (TV) as Herself
 Holly & Stephen's Saturday Showdown (episode dated 1 July 2006) (2006) (TV series) as Herself
 T4 (episode dated 30 June 2006) (2006) (TV series) as Herself
 T4 on the Beach: The Cheeky Highlights (2006) (TV) as Herself
 Holly & Stephen's Saturday Showdown (episode dated 24 June 2006) (2006) (TV series) as Herself
 T4 on the Beach (2006) (TV) as Herself
 E4 Music Zone (episode Totally Frank's Ultimate Mix Tape) (2006) (TV series) as Herself
 T4 (episode dated 9 April 2006) (2006) (TV series) as Herself
 Smash Hits Poll Winners Party 2005 (2005) (TV) as Herself
 T4 (episode dated 25 September 2005) (2005) (TV series) as Herself
 Richard & Judy (episode dated 22 September 2005) (2005) (TV series) as Herself

Discography

Singles
in Frank

Albums
in Frank

References

External links

English soap opera actresses
Living people
Actresses from London
Year of birth missing (living people)